Higlo is a town in Aynabo District, in the Sool region of Somaliland.

Overview 
Higlo is situated in the Aynaba District in the western part of Sool region. Higlo is northwest of Aynaba, the administrative seat of the wider district.

See also

Populated places in Sool, Somaliland